is a manga series written and illustrated by Masayoshi. It has been published in the web comic magazine Comic Polaris since October 2012 and collected in 4 tankōbon volumes as of December 2015.

Plot
Fourth graders Yūta Kimura and Yui Ōtsuka inexplicably swap bodies after Yūta falls from a tree and lands on Yui. Years pass, and with no known way to change back to their former selves, the two struggle through adolescence. Filled with comical, relatable, and heartwarming moments, the two struggle to handle each other's lives in the other person's shoes.

Characters

Main
 He was formerly a thrill-seeking boy, but "he's" now mature since Yui took over his body.
 She was formerly a lone, "goody-two shoes" girl, but "she's" now gregarious since Yuuta took over her body.

Supporting
 - Yuuta's best friend who becomes his and Yui's mutual confidant, the only person fully aware of their situation.
 - Yuuta's little brother who quickly realizes his brother has changed into a different person but grows fond of the new Yuuta (actually Yui).
 - Yuuta's middle school classmate who is attracted to him (actually Yui).
 - Yui's middle school classmate and friend after she (actually Yuuta) stands up to her bullies.
 - Yuuta's high school classmate, an aspiring musician who befriends him (actually Yui).
 - Yui's high school classmate whom she (actually Yuuta) befriends at the request of a teacher.
Koizumi Erina (小泉えりな Erina Koizumi) - Yui's high school classmate whom she (actually Yuuta) befriends. She found out the two's secret, about switching, but not what exactly Yuuta's original body is.

Media

Manga
The manga series are written and illustrated by Masayoshi and have been released in the web comic magazine Comic Polaris since October 2012. As of December 2015, the manga has been collected into 4 tankōbon volumes.

Volume list

Reception
The series ranked 15th in the first Next Manga Award in the print manga category.

References

External links
Shisyunki Bitter Change at Comic Polaris 
Masayoshi's blog 

Japanese comedy webcomics
Shōjo manga
Webcomics in print
Fiction about body swapping
Transgender in anime and manga